Sabyasachi is a masculine Indian given name. Notable people with the name include:
 Kazi Sabyasachi, Indian Bengali elocutionist.
 Sabyasachi Chakrabarty, Indian Bengali actor.
 Sabyasachi Hajara, Indian business executive.
 Sabyasachi Mishra, Indian Odia actor.
 Sabyasachi Mohapatra, Indian Odia actor, director.
 Sabyasachi Mukherjee, Indian fashion designer.
 Sabyasachi Sarkar, Indian chemist.
 Sabyasachi (film), 1977 Bengali film.
 Sabyasachi Mukharji, was an Indian jurist, who was the twentieth Chief Justice of India

Indian masculine given names